Carl Bezuidenhout (born 10 February 1986 in Grahamstown) is a former South African rugby union footballer. He played either as a fly-half or full-back and played professional rugby between 2006 and 2015. He retired in 2015 to take up a teaching post at Union Schools in Graaff-Reinet.

Career

He also scored eight points in the first leg of their promotion play-off match to help the Pumas to win promotion to the 2014 Currie Cup Premier Division.

In 2014, he joined Scottish Pro12 side Edinburgh on an extended trial until the end of the 2013–14 season. His first appearance came as a half-time substitute during the Heineken Cup victory over USA Perpignan on 11 January 2014.

He was unable to clinch a regular place in the Edinburgh XV, however, and in the season 2014–2015 professional players draft, he was assigned to Boroughmuir RFC and played mainly for that club in the BT Premiership, the highest level of amateur club rugby in Scotland.

He signed off from Scottish rugby when he scored 16 points in helping Boroughmuir to win the Scottish Cup, beating Hawick 55-17 in the final, at Murrayfield Stadium, on Saturday, 18 April 2015.

Representative rugby

Bezuidenhout was included in the South Africa Sevens team for the 2007 Wellington Sevens and 2007 USA Sevens competitions during the 2006–07 IRB Sevens World Series.

In 2013, he was included in a South Africa President's XV team that played in the 2013 IRB Tbilisi Cup and won the tournament after winning all three matches. He top scored for the South Africa President's XV team with 25 points.

External links

itsrugby.co.uk profile

References

Living people
1986 births
People from Makhanda, Eastern Cape
South African rugby union players
Rugby union fullbacks
Pumas (Currie Cup) players
Sharks (Currie Cup) players
Eastern Province Elephants players
Edinburgh Rugby players
Rugby union players from the Eastern Cape